Wu Nan (born December 9, 1991 in Beijing) is a Chinese ice dancer. His partner is Zhang Yiyi.

Programs 
(with Zhang)

Competitive highlights 
(with Zhang)

References

External links 

 
 
 
 

1993 births
Living people
Chinese male ice dancers
Figure skaters from Beijing
Competitors at the 2013 Winter Universiade
Competitors at the 2011 Winter Universiade